Defending champion Martina Navratilova defeated Steffi Graf in the final, 7–6(7–4), 6–1 to win the women's singles tennis title at the 1987 US Open. It was her fourth US Open singles title and 17th major singles title overall.

Six-time champion Chris Evert lost in the quarterfinals to Lori McNeil. This marked the first time Evert lost before the semifinals at the US Open, ending a streak of 17 consecutive semifinal appearances.

Seeds
The seeded players are listed below. Martina Navratilova is the champion; others show the round in which they were eliminated.

  Steffi Graf (finalist)
  Martina Navratilova (champion)
  Chris Evert (quarterfinalist)
  Hana Mandlíková (fourth round)
  Pam Shriver (quarterfinalist)
  Helena Suková (semifinalist)
  Zina Garrison (fourth round)
  Gabriela Sabatini (quarterfinalist)
  Claudia Kohde-Kilsch (quarterfinalist)
  Manuela Maleeva-Fragnière (fourth round)
  Lori McNeil (semifinalist)
  Bettina Bunge (fourth round)
  Sylvia Hanika (fourth round)
  Catarina Lindqvist (fourth round)
  Barbara Potter (first round)
  Wendy Turnbull (second round)

Qualifying

Draw

Key
 Q = Qualifier
 WC = Wild card
 LL = Lucky loser
 r = Retired

Final eight

Earlier rounds

Section 1

Section 2

Section 3

Section 4

Section 5

Section 6

Section 7

Section 8

External links
1987 US Open – Women's draws and results at the International Tennis Federation

Women's Singles
US Open (tennis) by year – Women's singles
1987 in women's tennis
1987 in American women's sports